St. Louis is the second-largest city in Missouri, United States. It is located near the confluence of the Mississippi and the Missouri Rivers. In 2020, the city proper had a population of 301,578, while its bi-state metropolitan area, which extends into Illinois, had an estimated population of over 2.8 million, making it the largest metropolitan area in Missouri and the second-largest in Illinois.

Before European settlement, the area was a regional center of Native American Mississippian culture. St. Louis was founded on February 14, 1764, by French fur traders Gilbert Antoine de St. Maxent, Pierre Laclède and Auguste Chouteau, who named it for king Louis IX of France, and it quickly became the regional center of the old Illinois Country. In 1764, following France's defeat in the Seven Years' War, the area was ceded to Spain. In 1800, it was retroceded to France, which sold it three years later to the United States as part of the Louisiana Purchase; the city was then the point of embarkation for the Corps of Discovery on the Lewis and Clark Expedition. In the 19th century, St. Louis became a major port on the Mississippi River; from 1870 until the 1920 census, it was the fourth-largest city in the country. It separated from St. Louis County in 1877, becoming an independent city and limiting its political boundaries. In 1904, it hosted the Louisiana Purchase Exposition and the Summer Olympics.

A global city with a metropolitan GDP of more than $160 billion in 2017, metropolitan St. Louis has a diverse economy with strengths in the service, manufacturing, trade, transportation, and tourism industries. It is home to eight Fortune 500 companies. Major companies headquartered or with significant operations in the city include Ameren Corporation, Peabody Energy, Nestlé Purina PetCare, Anheuser-Busch, Wells Fargo Advisors, Stifel Financial, Spire, Inc., MilliporeSigma, FleishmanHillard, Square, Inc., Anthem BlueCross and Blue Shield, Federal Reserve Bank of St. Louis, U.S. Department of Agriculture, National Geospatial-Intelligence Agency, Centene Corporation, and Express Scripts.

Major research universities include Washington University in St. Louis, Saint Louis University and University of Missouri–St. Louis. The Washington University Medical Center in the Central West End neighborhood hosts an agglomeration of medical and pharmaceutical institutions, including Barnes-Jewish Hospital.

St. Louis has four professional sports teams: the St. Louis Cardinals of Major League Baseball, the St. Louis Blues of the National Hockey League, St. Louis City SC of Major League Soccer, and the St. Louis BattleHawks of the XFL. Among the city's notable sights is the  Gateway Arch in Downtown St. Louis, the St. Louis Zoo, the Missouri Botanical Garden, the St. Louis Art Museum, and Bellefontaine Cemetery and Arboretum.

History

Mississippian culture and European exploration

The area that would become St. Louis was a center of the Native American Mississippian culture, which built numerous temple and residential earthwork mounds on both sides of the Mississippi River. Their major regional center was at Cahokia Mounds, active from 900 to 1500. Due to numerous major earthworks within St. Louis boundaries, the city was nicknamed as the "Mound City". These mounds were mostly demolished during the city's development. Historic Native American tribes in the area included the Siouan-speaking Osage people, whose territory extended west, and the Illiniwek.

European exploration of the area was first recorded in 1673, when French explorers Louis Jolliet and Jacques Marquette traveled through the Mississippi River valley.  Five years later, La Salle claimed the region for France as part of Louisiana.

The earliest European settlements in the area were built in the Illinois Country (also known as Upper Louisiana) on the east side of the Mississippi River during the 1690s and early 1700s at Cahokia, Kaskaskia, and Fort de Chartres. Migrants from the French villages on the opposite side of the Mississippi River (e.g. Kaskaskia) founded Ste. Genevieve in the 1730s.

In 1764, after France lost the Seven Years' War, Pierre Laclède and his stepson Auguste Chouteau founded what was to become the city of St. Louis. (French lands east of the Mississippi had been ceded to Great Britain and the lands west of the Mississippi to Spain; France and Spain were 18th-century allies. Louis XV of France and Charles III of Spain were cousins, both from the House of Bourbon.)  The French families built the city's economy on the fur trade with the Osage, as well as with more distant tribes along the Missouri River. The Chouteau brothers gained a monopoly from Spain on the fur trade with Santa Fe. French colonists used African slaves as domestic servants and workers in the city.

France, alarmed that Britain would demand French possessions west of the Mississippi and the Missouri River basin after losing New France to them in 1759–1760, transferred these to Spain as part of the Viceroyalty of New Spain. These areas remained in Spanish possession until 1803. In 1780 during the American Revolutionary War, St. Louis was attacked by British forces, mostly Native American allies, in the Battle of St. Louis.

City founding

The founding of St. Louis was preceded by a trading business between Gilbert Antoine de St. Maxent and Pierre Laclède (Liguest) in the fall of 1763. St. Maxent invested in a Mississippi River expedition led by Laclède, who searched for a location to base the company's fur trading operations. Though Ste. Genevieve was already established as a trading center, he sought a place less prone to flooding. He found an elevated area overlooking the flood plain of the Mississippi River, not far south from its confluence with the Missouri and Illinois rivers. In addition to having an advantageous natural drainage system, there were nearby forested areas to supply timber and grasslands which could easily be converted for agricultural purposes. This place, declared Laclède, “might become, hereafter, one of the finest cities in America.” He dispatched his 14-year-old stepson, Auguste Chouteau, to the site, with the support of 30 settlers in February 1764.

Laclède arrived at the future town site two months later and produced a plan for St. Louis based on the New Orleans street plan. The default block size was 240 by 300 feet, with just three long avenues running parallel to the west bank of the Mississippi. He established a public corridor of 300 feet fronting the river, but later this area was released for private development.

For the first few years of St. Louis's existence, the city was not recognized by any of the governments.  Although the settlement was thought to be under the control of the Spanish government, no one asserted any authority over it, and thus St. Louis had no local government. This vacuum led Laclède to assume civil control, and all problems were disposed in public settings, such as communal meetings.  In addition, Laclède granted new settlers lots in town and the surrounding countryside.  In hindsight, many of these original settlers thought of these first few years as "the golden age of St. Louis".

By 1765, the city began receiving visits from representatives of the English, French, and Spanish governments.  The Indians in the area expressed dissatisfaction at being under the control of British forces.  One of the great Ottawa chieftains, Pontiac, was angered by the change of power and the potential for the British to come into their lands.  He desired to fight against them but many of the St. Louis inhabitants refused.

St. Louis was transferred to the French First Republic in 1800 (although all of the colonial lands continued to be administered by Spanish officials), then sold by the French to the U.S. in 1803 as part of the Louisiana Purchase. St. Louis became the capital of, and gateway to, the new territory. Shortly after the official transfer of authority was made, the Lewis and Clark Expedition was commissioned by President Thomas Jefferson. The expedition departed from St. Louis in May 1804 along the Missouri River to explore the vast territory. There were hopes of finding a water route to the Pacific Ocean, but the party had to go overland in the Upper West. They reached the Pacific Ocean via the Columbia River in summer 1805. They returned, reaching St. Louis on September 23, 1806. Both Lewis and Clark lived in St. Louis after the expedition. Many other explorers, settlers, and trappers (such as Ashley's Hundred) would later take a similar route to the West.

19th century

The city elected its first municipal legislators (called trustees) in 1808. Steamboats first arrived in St. Louis in 1817, improving connections with New Orleans and eastern markets. Missouri was admitted as a state in 1821. St. Louis was incorporated as a city in 1822, and continued to develop largely due to its busy port and trade connections.

Immigrants from Ireland and Germany arrived in St. Louis in significant numbers starting in the 1840s, and the population of St. Louis grew from less than 20,000 inhabitants in 1840, to 77,860 in 1850, to more than 160,000 by 1860. By the mid-1800s, St. Louis had a greater population than New Orleans.

Settled by many Southerners in a slave state, the city was split in political sympathies and became polarized during the American Civil War. In 1861, 28 civilians were killed in a clash with Union troops. The war hurt St. Louis economically, due to the Union blockade of river traffic to the south on the Mississippi River. The St. Louis Arsenal constructed ironclads for the Union Navy.

Slaves worked in many jobs on the waterfront as well as on the riverboats. Given the city's location close to the free state of Illinois and others, some slaves escaped to freedom. Others, especially women with children, sued in court in freedom suits, and several prominent local attorneys aided slaves in these suits. About half the slaves achieved freedom in hundreds of suits before the American Civil War.
The printing press of abolitionist Elijah Parish Lovejoy was destroyed for the third time by townsfolk. He was murdered the next year in nearby Alton, Illinois.

After the war, St. Louis profited via trade with the West, aided by the 1874 completion of the Eads Bridge, named for its design engineer. Industrial developments on both banks of the river were linked by the bridge, the second in the Midwest over the Mississippi River after the Hennepin Avenue Bridge in Minneapolis. The bridge connects St. Louis, Missouri to East St. Louis, Illinois. The Eads Bridge became a symbolic image of the city of St. Louis, from the time of its erection until 1965 when the Gateway Arch Bridge was constructed. The bridge crosses the St. Louis riverfront between Laclede's Landing, to the north, and the grounds of the Gateway Arch, to the south. Today the road deck has been restored, allowing vehicular and pedestrian traffic to cross the river. The St. Louis MetroLink light rail system has used the rail deck since 1993. An estimated 8,500 vehicles pass through it daily.

On August 22, 1876, the city of St. Louis voted to secede from St. Louis County and become an independent city, and, following a recount of the votes in November, officially did so in March 1877. Industrial production continued to increase during the late 19th century. Major corporations such as the Anheuser-Busch brewery, Ralston Purina company and Desloge Consolidated Lead Company were established at St. Louis which was also home to several brass era automobile companies, including the Success Automobile Manufacturing Company; St. Louis is the site of the Wainwright Building, a skyscraper designed in 1892 by architect Louis Sullivan.

20th century

In 1904, the city hosted the World's Fair and the Olympics, becoming the first non-European city to host the games. Permanent facilities and structures remaining from the fair are located in Forest Park, and other notable structures within the park's boundaries include the St. Louis Art Museum, the St. Louis Zoo and the Missouri History Museum, as well as Tower Grove Park and the Botanical Gardens.

After the Civil War, social and racial discrimination in housing and employment were common in St. Louis. In 1916, during the Jim Crow Era, St. Louis passed a residential segregation ordinance saying that if 75% of the residents of a neighborhood were of a certain race, no one from a different race was allowed to move in. That ordinance was struck down in a court challenge, by the NAACP, after which racial covenants were used to prevent the sale of houses in certain neighborhoods to "persons not of Caucasian race". Again, St. Louisans offered a lawsuit in challenge, and such covenants were ruled unconstitutional by the U.S. Supreme Court in 1948 in Shelley v. Kraemer.

In 1926, Douglass University, a historically black university was founded by B. F. Bowles in St. Louis, and at the time no other college in St. Louis County admitted black students.

In the first half of the 20th century, St. Louis was a destination in the Great Migration of African Americans from the rural South seeking better opportunities. During World War II, the NAACP campaigned to integrate war factories. In 1964, civil rights activists protested at the construction of the Gateway Arch to publicize their effort to gain entry for African Americans into the skilled trade unions, where they were underrepresented. The Department of Justice filed the first suit against the unions under the Civil Rights Act of 1964.

Between 1900 and 1929, St. Louis, had about 220 automakers, close to 10 percent of all American carmakers, about half of which built cars exclusively in St. Louis. Notable names include Dorris, Gardner and Moon.

In the first part of the century, St. Louis had some of the worst air pollution in the United States. In April 1940, the city banned the use of soft coal mined in nearby states. The city hired inspectors to ensure that only anthracite was burned. By 1946, the city had reduced air pollution by about 75%.

De jure educational segregation continued into the 1950s, and de facto segregation continued into the 1970s, leading to a court challenge and interdistrict desegregation agreement. Students have been bused mostly from the city to county school districts to have opportunities for integrated classes, although the city has created magnet schools to attract students.

St. Louis, like many Midwestern cities, expanded in the early 20th century due to industrialization, which provided jobs to new generations of immigrants and migrants from the South. It reached its peak population of 856,796 at the 1950 census. Suburbanization from the 1950s through the 1990s dramatically reduced the city's population, as did restructuring of industry and loss of jobs. The effects of suburbanization were exacerbated by the small geographical size of St. Louis due to its earlier decision to become an independent city, and it lost much of its tax base. During the 19th and 20th century, most major cities aggressively annexed surrounding areas as residential development occurred away from the central city; however, St. Louis was unable to do so.

Several urban renewal projects were built in the 1950s, as the city worked to replace old and substandard housing. Some of these were poorly designed and resulted in problems. One prominent example, Pruitt–Igoe, became a symbol of failure in public housing, and was torn down less than two decades after it was built.

Since the 1980s, several revitalization efforts have focused on Downtown St. Louis.

21st century

Urban revitalization continued in the new century. Gentrification has taken place in the Washington Avenue Historic District, Central West End and Forest Park Southeast neighborhoods. This helped St. Louis win the World Leadership Award for urban renewal in 2006. In 2017 the US Census Bureau estimated that St. Louis had a population of 308,826, down from 319,371 in 2010.

In the 21st century, the city of St. Louis contains 11% of the total metropolitan population. (The top 20 U.S. metro areas have an average of 24% of their populations in their central cities.) St. Louis grew slightly during the early 2000s, but lost population from 2000 to 2010. Immigration has continued, with the city attracting Vietnamese, Latin Americans predominantly from Mexico, and Bosnians, who make up the largest Bosnian community outside of Bosnia and Herzegovina.

Geography

Cityscape

Landmarks

Architecture

The architecture of St. Louis exhibits a variety of commercial, residential, and monumental architecture. The Arch pays homage to Thomas Jefferson and St. Louis's position as the gateway to the West. Architectural influences reflected in the area include French Colonial, German, early American, and modern architectural styles.

Some notable post-modern commercial skyscrapers were built downtown in the 1970s and 1980s, including the One US Bank Plaza (1976), the AT&T Center (1986), and One Metropolitan Square (1989), which is the tallest building in St. Louis. One US Bank Plaza, the local headquarters for US Bancorp, was constructed for the Mercantile Bancorporation in the Structural expressionist style, emphasizing the steel structure of the building.

During the 1990s, St. Louis saw the construction of the largest United States courthouse by area, the Thomas F. Eagleton United States Courthouse (completed in 2000). The Eagleton Courthouse is home to the United States District Court for the Eastern District of Missouri and the United States Court of Appeals for the Eighth Circuit. The most recent high-rise buildings in St. Louis include two residential towers: the Park East Tower in the Central West End and the Roberts Tower located downtown.

Several examples of religious structures are extant from the pre-Civil War period, and most reflect the common residential styles of the time. Among the earliest is the Basilica of St. Louis, King of France ( referred to as the Old Cathedral). The Basilica was built between 1831 and 1834 in the Federal style. Other religious buildings from the period include SS. Cyril and Methodius Church (1857) in the Romanesque Revival style and Christ Church Cathedral (completed in 1867, designed in 1859) in the Gothic Revival style.

A few civic buildings were constructed during the early 19th century. The original St. Louis courthouse was built in 1826 and featured a Federal style stone facade with a rounded portico. However, this courthouse was replaced during renovation and expansion of the building in the 1850s. The Old St. Louis County Courthouse (known as the Old Courthouse) was completed in 1864 and was notable for having a cast iron dome and for being the tallest structure in Missouri until 1894. Finally, a customs house was constructed in the Greek Revival style in 1852, but was demolished and replaced in 1873 by the U.S. Customhouse and Post Office.

Because much of the city's commercial and industrial development was centered along the riverfront, many pre-Civil War buildings were demolished during construction of the Gateway Arch. The city's remaining architectural heritage of the era includes a multi-block district of cobblestone streets and brick and cast-iron warehouses called Laclede's Landing. Now popular for its restaurants and nightclubs, the district is located north of Gateway Arch along the riverfront. Other industrial buildings from the era include some portions of the Anheuser-Busch Brewery, which date to the 1860s.

St. Louis saw a vast expansion in variety and number of religious buildings during the late 19th century and early 20th century. The largest and most ornate of these is the Cathedral Basilica of St. Louis, designed by Thomas P. Barnett and constructed between 1907 and 1914 in the Neo-Byzantine style. The St. Louis Cathedral, as it is known, has one of the largest mosaic collections in the world. Another landmark in religious architecture of St. Louis is the St. Stanislaus Kostka, which is an example of the Polish Cathedral style. Among the other major designs of the period were St. Alphonsus Liguori (known as The Rock Church) (1867) in the Gothic Revival and Second Presbyterian Church of St. Louis (1900) in Richardsonian Romanesque.

By the 1900 census, St. Louis was the fourth largest city in the country. In 1904, the city hosted a world's fair at Forest Park called the Louisiana Purchase Exposition. Its architectural legacy is somewhat scattered. Among the fair-related cultural institutions in the park are the St. Louis Art Museum designed by Cass Gilbert, part of the remaining lagoon at the foot of Art Hill, and the Flight Cage at the St. Louis Zoo. The Missouri History Museum was built afterward, with the profit from the fair. But 1904 left other assets to the city, like Theodore Link's 1894 St. Louis Union Station, and an improved Forest Park.

Neighborhoods

The city is divided into 79 government-designated neighborhoods. The neighborhood divisions have no legal standing, although some neighborhood associations administer grants or hold veto power over historic-district development.

Several neighborhoods are lumped together in categories such as "North City", "South City", and "The Central West End".

Topography

The city is built on bluffs and terraces that rise 100–200 feet above the western banks of the Mississippi River, in the Midwestern United States just south of the Missouri-Mississippi confluence. Much of the area is a fertile and gently rolling prairie that features low hills and broad, shallow valleys. Both the Mississippi River and the Missouri River have cut large valleys with wide flood plains.

Limestone and dolomite of the Mississippian epoch underlie the area, and parts of the city are karst in nature. This is particularly true of the area south of downtown, which has numerous sinkholes and caves. Most of the caves in the city have been sealed, but many springs are visible along the riverfront. Coal, brick clay, and millerite ore were once mined in the city. The predominant surface rock, known as St. Louis limestone, is used as dimension stone and rubble for construction.

Near the southern boundary of the city of St. Louis (separating it from St. Louis County) is the River des Peres, practically the only river or stream within the city limits that is not entirely underground. Most of River des Peres was confined to a channel or put underground in the 1920s and early 1930s. The lower section of the river was the site of some of the worst flooding of the Great Flood of 1993.

The city's eastern boundary is the Mississippi River, which separates Missouri from Illinois. The Missouri River forms the northern line of St. Louis County, except for a few areas where the river has changed its course. The Meramec River forms most of its southern line.

Climate 

The urban area of St. Louis has a humid subtropical climate (Köppen: Cfa); however, its metropolitan region even to the south may present a hot-summer humid continental climate (Dfa), which shows the effect of the urban heat island in the city. The city experiences hot, humid summers and chilly to cold winters. It is subject to both cold Arctic air and hot, humid tropical air from the Gulf of Mexico.

St. Louis experiences thunderstorms 48 days a year on average. Especially in the spring, these storms can often be severe, with high winds, large hail and tornadoes. Lying within the hotbed of Tornado Alley, St. Louis is one of the most frequently tornado-struck metropolitan areas in the U.S. and has an extensive history of damaging tornadoes. Severe flooding, such as the Great Flood of 1993, may occur in spring and summer; the (often rapid) melting of thick snow cover upstream on the Missouri or Mississippi Rivers can contribute to springtime flooding.

Flora and fauna

Before the founding of the city, the area was mostly prairie and open forest. Native Americans maintained this environment, good for hunting, by burning underbrush. Trees are mainly oak, maple, and hickory, similar to the forests of the nearby Ozarks; common understory trees include eastern redbud, serviceberry, and flowering dogwood. Riparian areas are forested with mainly American sycamore.

Most of the residential areas of the city are planted with large native shade trees. The largest native forest area is found in Forest Park. In autumn, the changing color of the trees is notable. Most species here are typical of the eastern woodland, although numerous decorative non-native species are found. The most notable invasive species is Japanese honeysuckle, which officials are trying to manage because of its damage to native trees. It is removed from some parks.

Large mammals found in the city include urbanized coyotes and white-tailed deer. Eastern gray squirrel, cottontail rabbit, and other rodents are abundant, as well as the nocturnal Virginia opossum. Large bird species are abundant in parks and include Canada goose, mallard duck, as well as shorebirds, including the great egret and great blue heron. Gulls are common along the Mississippi River; these species follow barge traffic.

Winter populations of bald eagles are found along the Mississippi River around the Chain of Rocks Bridge. The city is on the Mississippi Flyway, used by migrating birds, and has a large variety of small bird species, common to the eastern US. The Eurasian tree sparrow, an introduced species, is limited in North America to the counties surrounding St. Louis. The city has special sites for birdwatching of migratory species, including Tower Grove Park.

Frogs are found in the springtime, especially after extensive wet periods. Common species include the American toad and species of chorus frogs called spring peepers, which are found in nearly every pond. Some years have outbreaks of cicadas or ladybugs. Mosquitoes, no-see-ums, and houseflies are common insect nuisances, especially in July and August; because of this, windows are almost always fitted with screens. Invasive populations of honeybees have declined in recent years. Numerous native species of pollinator insects have recovered to fill their ecological niche, and armadillos are seen throughout the St. Louis area.

Demographics

St. Louis grew slowly until the American Civil War, when industrialization and immigration sparked a boom. Mid-19th century immigrants included many Irish and Germans; later there were immigrants from southern and eastern Europe. In the early 20th century, African American and white migrants came from the South; the former as part of the Great Migration out of rural areas of the Deep South. Many came from Mississippi and Arkansas.

After years of immigration, migration, and expansion, the city reached its peak population in 1950. That year, the Census Bureau reported St. Louis's population as 82% White and 17.9% African American. After World War II, St. Louis began losing population to the suburbs, first because of increased demand for new housing, unhappiness with city services, ease of commuting by highways, and later, white flight. St. Louis's population decline has resulted in a significant increase of abandoned residential housing units and vacant lots throughout the city proper; this blight has attracted much wildlife (such as deer and coyotes) to the many abandoned overgrown lots.

St. Louis has lost 64.0% of its population  since the 1950 United States census, the highest percent of any city that had a population of 100,000 or more at the time of the 1950 Census. Detroit, Michigan, and Youngstown, Ohio, are the only other cities that have had population declines of at least 60% in the same time frame. The population of the city of St. Louis has been in decline since the 1950 census; during this period the population of the St. Louis Metropolitan Area, which includes more than one county, has grown every year and continues to do so. A big factor in the decline has been the rapid increase in suburbanization.

According to the 2010 United States census, St. Louis had 319,294 people living in 142,057 households, of which 67,488 households were families. The population density was 5,158.2 people per square mile (1,990.6/km). About 24% of the population was 19 or younger, 9% were 20 to 24, 31% were 25 to 44, 25% were 45 to 64, and 11% were 65 or older. The median age was about 34 years.

The African-American population is concentrated in the north side of the city (the area north of Delmar Boulevard is 94.0% black, compared with 35.0% in the central corridor and 26.0% in the south side of St. Louis). Among the Asian-American population in the city, the largest ethnic group is Vietnamese (0.9%), followed by Chinese (0.6%) and Indians (0.5%). The Vietnamese community has concentrated in the Dutchtown neighborhood of south St. Louis; Chinese are concentrated in the Central West End. People of Mexican descent are the largest Latino group, and make up 2.2% of St. Louis's population. They have the highest concentration in the Dutchtown, Benton Park West (Cherokee Street), and Gravois Park neighborhoods. People of Italian descent are concentrated in The Hill.

In 2000, the median income for a household in the city was $29,156, and the median income for a family was $32,585. Males had a median income of $31,106; females, $26,987. Per capita income was $18,108.

Some 19% of the city's housing units were vacant, and slightly less than half of these were vacant structures not for sale or rent.

In 2010, St. Louis's per-capita rates of online charitable donations and volunteerism were among the highest among major U.S. cities.

, 91.05% (270,934) of St. Louis city residents age 5 and older spoke English at home as a primary language, while 2.86% (8,516) spoke Spanish, 0.91% (2,713) Serbo-Croatian, 0.74% (2,200) Vietnamese, 0.50% (1,495) African languages, 0.50% (1,481) Chinese, and French was spoken as a main language by 0.45% (1,341) of the population over the age of five. In total, 8.95% (26,628) of St. Louis's population age 5 and older spoke a mother language other than English.

Bosnian population

About fifteen families from Bosnia settled in St. Louis between 1960 and 1970. After the Bosnian War started in 1992, more Bosnian refugees began arriving and by 2000, tens of thousands of Bosnian refugees settled in St. Louis with the help of Catholic aid societies. Many of them were professionals and skilled workers who had to take any job opportunity to be able to support their families. Most Bosnian refugees are Muslim, ethnically Bosniaks (87%); they have settled primarily in south St. Louis and South County. Bosnian-Americans are well integrated into the city, developing many businesses and ethnic/cultural organizations.

An estimated 70,000 Bosnians live in the metro area, the largest population of Bosnians in the United States and the largest Bosnian population outside their homeland. The highest concentration of Bosnians is in the neighborhood of Bevo Mill and in Affton, Mehlville, and Oakville of south St. Louis County.

Crime

Since 2014 the city of St. Louis has had, one of the highest murder rate, per capita, in the United States, with 188 homicides in 2015 (59.3 homicides per 100,000) and ranks No. 13 of the most dangerous cities in the world by homicide rate. Detroit, Flint, Memphis, Birmingham, and Baltimore have higher overall violent crime rates than St. Louis, when comparing other crimes such as rape, robbery, and aggravated assault. Despite these high crime rates relative to other American cities, St. Louis index crime rates have declined almost every year since the peak in 1993 (16,648), to the 2014 level of 7,931 (which is the sum of violent crimes and property crimes) per 100,000. In 2015, the index crime rate reversed the 2005–2014 decline to a level of 8,204. Between 2005 and 2014, violent crime has declined by 20%, although rates of violent crime remains 6 times higher than the United States national average and property crime in the city remains 2  times the national average. St. Louis has a higher homicide rate than the rest of the U.S. for both whites and blacks and a higher proportion committed by males. , 7 of the homicide suspects were white, 95 black, 0 Hispanic, 0 Asian and 1 female out of the 102 suspects. In 2016, St. Louis was the most dangerous city in the United States with populations of 100,000 or more, ranking 1st in violent crime and 2nd in property crime. It was also ranked 6th of the most dangerous of all establishments in the United States, and East St. Louis, a suburb of the city itself, was ranked 1st.  The St. Louis Police Department at the end of 2016 reported a total of 188 murders for the year, the same number of homicides that had occurred in the city in 2015. According to the STLP At the end of 2017, St. Louis had 205 murders but the city recorded only 159 inside St. Louis city limits. The new Chief of Police, John Hayden said two-thirds (67%) of all the murders and one-half of all the assaults are concentrated in a triangular area in the North part of the city.

Yet another factor when comparing the murder rates of St. Louis and other cities is the manner of drawing municipal boundaries. While many other municipalities have annexed many suburbs, St. Louis has not annexed as much suburban area as most American cities. According to a 2018 estimate, the St. Louis metro area included about 3 million residents and the city included about 300,000 residents. Therefore, the city contains about ten percent of the metro population, a low ratio indicating that the municipal boundaries include only a small part of the metro population.

Economy

The gross domestic product of the St. Louis metro area was $160 billion in 2016, up from $155 billion the previous year. The gross metropolitan product of Greater St. Louis was $146 billion in 2014, the 21st-highest in the country, up from $144 billion in 2013, $138.4 billion in 2012, and $133.1 billion in 2011. The St. Louis metropolitan area had a per-capita GDP of $48,738 in 2014, up 1.6% from the previous year. In 2007, manufacturing in the city conducted nearly $11 billion in business, followed by the health care and social service industry with $3.5 billion; professional or technical services with $3.1 billion; and the retail trade with $2.5 billion. The health care sector was the area's biggest employer with 34,000 workers, followed by administrative and support jobs, 24,000; manufacturing, 21,000, and food service, 20,000.

Major companies and institutions

As of 2022, the St. Louis Metropolitan Area is home to seven Fortune 500 companies. They include Centene, Emerson Electric, Reinsurance Group of America, Edward Jones, Olin, Graybar Electric, and Ameren.

Other notable corporations headquartered in the region include Arch Coal, Bunge Limited, Wells Fargo Advisors (formerly A.G. Edwards), Energizer Holdings, Patriot Coal, Post Foods, United Van Lines, and Mayflower Transit, Post Holdings, Olin, Enterprise Holdings (a parent company of several car rental companies). Notable corporations with operations in St. Louis include Cassidy Turley, Kerry Group, Mastercard, TD Ameritrade, BMO Harris Bank, and World Wide Technology.

Health care and biotechnology institutions with operations in St. Louis include Pfizer, the Donald Danforth Plant Science Center, the Solae Company, Sigma-Aldrich, and Multidata Systems International. General Motors manufactures automobiles in Wentzville, while an earlier plant, known as the St. Louis Truck Assembly, built GMC automobiles from 1920 until 1987. Chrysler closed its St. Louis Assembly production facility in nearby Fenton, Missouri and Ford closed the St. Louis Assembly Plant in Hazelwood.

Several once-independent pillars of the local economy have been purchased by other corporations. Among them are Anheuser-Busch, purchased by Belgium-based InBev; Missouri Pacific Railroad, which was headquartered in St. Louis, merged with the Omaha, Nebraska-based Union Pacific Railroad in 1982; McDonnell Douglas, whose operations are now part of Boeing Defense, Space & Security; Trans World Airlines, which was headquartered in the city for its last decade of existence, prior to being acquired by American Airlines; Mallinckrodt, purchased by Tyco International; and Ralston Purina, now a wholly owned subsidiary of Nestlé. The May Department Stores Company (which owned Famous-Barr and Marshall Field's stores) was purchased by Federated Department Stores, which has its regional headquarters in the area. The Federal Reserve Bank of St. Louis in downtown is one of two federal reserve banks in Missouri. Most of the assets of Furniture Brands International were sold to Heritage Home Group in 2013, which moved to North Carolina.

St. Louis is a center of medicine and biotechnology. The Washington University School of Medicine is affiliated with Barnes-Jewish Hospital, the fifth largest hospital in the world. Both institutions operate the Alvin J. Siteman Cancer Center. The School of Medicine also is affiliated with St. Louis Children's Hospital, one of the country's top pediatric hospitals. Both hospitals are owned by BJC HealthCare. The McDonnell Genome Institute at Washington University played a major role in the Human Genome Project. Saint Louis University Medical School is affiliated with SSM Health's Cardinal Glennon Children's Hospital and Saint Louis University Hospital. It also has a cancer center, vaccine research center, geriatric center, and a bioethics institute. Several different organizations operate hospitals in the area, including BJC HealthCare, Mercy, SSM Health Care, and Tenet.

Cortex Innovation Community in Midtown neighborhood is the largest innovation hub in the midwest. Cortex is home to offices of Square, Microsoft, Aon, Boeing, and Centene. Cortex has generated 3,800 tech jobs in 14 years. Once built out, projections are for it to make $2 billion in development and create 13,000 jobs for the region.

Boeing employs nearly 15,000 people in its north St. Louis campus, headquarters to its defense unit. In 2013, the company said it would move about 600 jobs from Seattle, where labor costs have risen, to a new IT center in St. Louis.  Other companies, such as LaunchCode and LockerDome, think the city could become the next major tech hub.  Programs such as Arch Grants are attracting new startups to the region.

According to the St. Louis Business Journal, the top employers in the St. Louis metropolitan area , are: 

According to St. Louis's 2021 Comprehensive Annual Financial Report (June 30), the top employers in the city only are (representing 78,706 people, or 19.57% of the city's total employment of 402,000):

Arts and culture

With its French past and waves of Catholic immigrants in the 19th and 20th centuries, from Ireland, Germany and Italy, St. Louis is a major center of Roman Catholicism in the United States. St. Louis also boasts the largest Ethical Culture Society in the United States and is one of the most generous cities in the United States, ranking ninth in 2013. Several places of worship in the city are noteworthy, such as the Cathedral Basilica of St. Louis, home of the world's largest mosaic installation.

Other notable churches include the Basilica of St. Louis, King of France, the oldest Roman Catholic cathedral west of the Mississippi River and the oldest church in St. Louis; the St. Louis Abbey, whose distinctive architectural style garnered multiple awards at the time of its completion in 1962; and St. Francis de Sales Oratory, a neo-Gothic church completed in 1908 in South St. Louis and the second largest church in the city.

The city is identified with music and the performing arts, especially its association with blues, jazz, and ragtime. St. Louis is home to the St. Louis Symphony, the second oldest symphony orchestra in the United States. Until 2010, it was also home to KFUO-FM, one of the oldest classical music FM radio stations west of the Mississippi River. Opera Theatre of St. Louis has been called "one of America's best summer festivals" by the Washington Post. Former general director Timothy O'Leary was known for drawing the community into discussions of challenging operas. John Adams's "The Death of Klinghoffer", which touched off protests and controversy when performed by the Metropolitan Opera in 2014, had no such problems in St. Louis three years before, because the company fostered a citywide discussion, with interfaith dialogues addressing the tough issues of terrorism, religion and the nature of evil that the opera brings up. St. Louis's Jewish Community Relations Council gave O'Leary an award. Under O'Leary, the company — always known for innovative work — gave second chances to other major American operas, such as John Corigliano's "The Ghosts of Versailles", presented in 2009 in a smaller-scale version.

The Gateway Arch anchors downtown St. Louis and a historic center that includes: the Federal courthouse where the Dred Scott case was first argued, an expanded public library, major churches and businesses, and retail. An increasing downtown residential population has taken to adapted office buildings and other historic structures. In nearby University City is the Delmar Loop, ranked by the American Planning Association as a "great American street" for its variety of shops and restaurants, and the Tivoli Theater, all within walking distance.

Unique city and regional cuisine reflecting various immigrant groups include toasted ravioli, gooey butter cake, provel cheese, the slinger, the Gerber sandwich, and the St. Paul sandwich. Some St. Louis chefs have begun emphasizing use of local produce, meats and fish, and neighborhood farmers' markets have become more popular. Artisan bakeries, salumeria, and chocolatiers also operate in the city.

St. Louis-style pizza has thin crust, provel cheese, and is cut in small squares. Frozen-custard purveyor Ted Drewes offers its "Concrete": frozen custard blended with any combination of dozens of ingredients into a mixture so thick that a spoon inserted into the custard does not fall if the cup is inverted.

Sports

St. Louis is home to the St. Louis Cardinals of Major League Baseball and the St. Louis Blues of the National Hockey League. In 2019, it became the ninth North American city to have won titles in all four major leagues (MLB, NBA, NFL, and NHL) when the Blues won the Stanley Cup championship. It also has notable and collegiate-level soccer teams and is one of three American cities to have hosted an Olympic Games. A third major team, the St. Louis City SC of Major League Soccer, began play in 2023.

Professional sports
Pro teams in the St. Louis area include:

The St. Louis Cardinals are one of the most successful franchises in Major League Baseball. The Cardinals have won 19 National League (NL) titles (the most pennants for the league franchise in one city) and 11 World Series titles (second to the New York Yankees and the most by any NL franchise), recently in 2011. They play at Busch Stadium. Previously, the St. Louis Browns played in the American League (AL) from 1902 to 1953, before moving to Baltimore, Maryland to become the current incarnation of the Orioles. The 1944 World Series was an all-St. Louis World Series, matching up the St. Louis Cardinals and St. Louis Browns at Sportsman's Park, won by the Cardinals in six games. It was the third and final time that the teams shared a home field. St. Louis also was home to the St. Louis Stars (baseball), also known as the St. Louis Giants from 1906 to 1921, who played in the Negro league baseball from 1920 to 1931 and won championships in 1928, 1930, and 1931, and the St. Louis Maroons who played in both the Union Association in 1884 and the National League from 1885 to 1889. In 1884, The St. Louis Maroons won the Union Association pennant and started the season with 20 straight wins, a feat that wasn't surpassed by any major professional sports team in America until the 2015-16 Golden State Warriors season when they started their NBA season with 24 straight wins.

The St. Louis Blues of the National Hockey League (NHL) play at the Enterprise Center. They were one of the six teams added to the NHL in the 1967 expansion. The Blues went to the Stanley Cup finals in their first three years, but got swept every time. Although they were the first 1967 expansion team to make the Stanley Cup Finals, they were also the last of the 1967 expansion teams to win the Stanley Cup. They finally won their first Stanley Cup in 2019 after beating the Boston Bruins in the final. This championship made St. Louis the eighth city to win a championship in each of the four major U.S. sports. Prior to the Blues, the city was home to the St. Louis Eagles.  The team played in the 1934–35 season.

St. Louis has been home to four National Football League (NFL) teams.  The St. Louis All-Stars played in the city in 1923, the St. Louis Gunners in 1934, the St. Louis Cardinals from 1960 to 1987, and the St. Louis Rams from 1995 to 2015.  The football Cardinals advanced to the NFL playoffs three times (1974, 1975 and 1982), never hosting or winning in any appearance.  The Cardinals moved to Phoenix, Arizona, in 1988. The Rams played at the Edward Jones Dome from 1995 to 2015 and won Super Bowl XXXIV in 2000. They also went to Super Bowl XXXVI but lost to the New England Patriots. The Rams then returned to Los Angeles in 2016.

The St. Louis Hawks of the National Basketball Association (NBA) played at Kiel Auditorium from 1955 to 1968. They won the NBA championship in 1958 and played in three other NBA Finals: 1957, 1960, and 1961. In 1968 the Hawks moved to Atlanta. St. Louis was also the home to the St. Louis Bombers of the Basketball Association of America from 1946 to 1949 and the National Basketball Association from 1949 to 1950 and the Spirits of St. Louis of the American Basketball Association from 1974 to 1976 when the ABA and NBA merged.

Major League Soccer's St. Louis City SC began play in 2023 at Citypark.

The St. Louis BattleHawks of the XFL began play in 2020, using The Dome at America's Center as their home field.

St. Louis hosts several minor league sports teams. The Gateway Grizzlies of the independent Frontier League play in the area. The St. Louis Trotters of the Independent Basketball Association play at Matthews Dickey. Saint Louis FC soccer team in the USL Championship play at World Wide Technology Soccer Park and the St. Louis Ambush indoor soccer team plays at the Family Arena. The region hosts INDYCAR, NHRA drag racing, and NASCAR events at World Wide Technology Raceway at Gateway in Madison, Illinois. St. Louis Slam play at the Harlen C. Hunter Stadium

Amateur sports
St. Louis has hosted the Final Four of both the women's and men's college basketball NCAA Division I championship tournaments, and the Frozen Four collegiate ice hockey tournament. Saint Louis University has won 10 NCAA men's soccer championships, and the city has hosted the College Cup several times. In addition to collegiate soccer, many St. Louisans have played for the United States men's national soccer team, and 20 St. Louisans have been elected into the National Soccer Hall of Fame. St. Louis also is the origin of the sport of corkball, a type of baseball in which there is no base running.

Although the area does not have a National Basketball Association team, it hosts the St. Louis Phoenix, an American Basketball Association team.

Club Atletico Saint Louis, a semi-professional soccer team, competes within the National Premier Soccer League and plays out of St. Louis University High School Soccer Stadium.

Chess

St. Louis is home to the Saint Louis Chess Club where the U.S. Chess Championship is held. St. Louisan Rex Sinquefield founded the Chess Club and Scholastic Center of St. Louis (which was renamed as St. Louis Chess Club later)  and moved the World Chess Hall of Fame to St. Louis in 2011. The Sinquefield Cup Tournament started at St. Louis in 2013. In 2014 the Sinquefield Cup was the highest-rated chess tournament of all time. Former U.S. Chess Champions Fabiano Caruana and Hikaru Nakamura have lived in St. Louis. Former women's chess champion Susan Polgar also resides in St. Louis.

Parks and recreation

The city operates more than 100 parks, with amenities that include sports facilities, playgrounds, concert areas, picnic areas, and lakes. Forest Park, located on the western edge of city, is the largest, occupying 1,400 acres of land, making it almost twice as large as Central Park in New York City. The park is home to five major institutions, including the St. Louis Art Museum, the St. Louis Zoo, the St. Louis Science Center, the Missouri History Museum, and the Muny amphitheatre. Another significant park in the city is Gateway Arch National Park, which was known as Jefferson National Expansion Memorial until 2018 and is located on the riverfront in downtown St. Louis. Also part of the historic park is the Old Courthouse, where the first two trials of Dred Scott v. Sandford were held in 1847 and 1850.

Other notable parks in the city include the Missouri Botanical Garden, Tower Grove Park, Carondelet Park and Citygarden. The Missouri Botanical Garden, a private garden and botanical research facility, is a National Historic Landmark and one of the oldest botanical gardens in the United States. The Garden features 79 acres of horticultural displays from around the world. This includes a Japanese strolling garden, Henry Shaw's original 1850 estate home and a geodesic dome called the Climatron. Immediately south of the Missouri Botanical Garden is Tower Grove Park, a gift to the city by Henry Shaw. Citygarden is an urban sculpture park located in downtown St. Louis, with art from Fernand Léger, Aristide Maillol, Julian Opie, Tom Otterness, Niki de Saint Phalle, and Mark di Suvero.  The park is divided into three sections, each of which represent a different theme: river bluffs; flood plains; and urban gardens.  Another downtown sculpture park is the Serra Sculpture Park, with the 1982 Richard Serra sculpture Twain.

Government
St. Louis is one of the 41 independent cities in the U.S. that does not legally belong to any county. St. Louis has a strong mayor–council government with legislative authority and oversight vested in the Board of Aldermen and with executive authority in the mayor and six other elected officials. The Board of Aldermen is made up of 28 members (one elected from each of the city's wards) plus a board president who is elected citywide. 
The 2014 fiscal year budget topped $1 billion for the first time, a 1.9% increase over the $985.2 million budget in 2013. 238,253 registered voters lived in the city in 2012, down from 239,247 in 2010, and 257,442 in 2008.

Structure

The mayor is the chief executive officer of the city and is responsible for appointing city department heads including; the director of public safety, the director of streets & traffic, the director of health, the director of human services, the director of the airport, the director of parks & recreation, the director of workforce development, the director of the Community Development Agency, the director of economic development, the director of public utilities, the director of the Civil Rights Enforcement Agency, the register, and the assessor, among other department-level or senior administrative positions. The President of the Board of Aldermen is the second highest-ranking official in the city. The President is the presiding officer of the Board of Aldermen which is the legislative branch of government of the city.

Municipal elections in St. Louis are held in odd-numbered years, with the primary elections in March and the general election in April. The mayor is elected in odd-numbered years following the United States presidential election, as are the aldermen representing odd-numbered wards. The president of the board of aldermen and the aldermen from even-numbered wards are elected in the off-years. The Democratic Party has dominated St. Louis city politics for decades. The city has not had a Republican mayor since 1949, and the last time a Republican was elected to another citywide office was in the 1970s. , all 28 of the city's aldermen are Democrats.

Forty-seven individuals have held the office of mayor of St. Louis, four of whom—William Carr Lane, John Fletcher Darby, John Wimer, and John How—served non-consecutive terms. The most terms served by a mayor was by Lane, who served 8 full terms plus the unexpired term of Darby. The current mayor is Tishaura Jones, who took office April 20, 2021, and is the first African-American woman to hold the post. She succeeded Lyda Krewson, the first female mayor of the city, who retired in 2021 after serving for four years. The longest-serving mayor was Francis Slay, who took office April 17, 2001, and left office April 18, 2017, a total of 16 years and six days over four terms in office. The shortest-serving mayor was Arthur Barret, who died 11 days after taking office.

Although St. Louis separated from St. Louis County in 1876, some mechanisms have been put in place for joint funding management and funding of regional assets. The St. Louis Zoo-Museum district collects property taxes from residents of both St. Louis City and County, and the funds are used to support cultural institutions including the St. Louis Zoo, St. Louis Art Museum and the Missouri Botanical Gardens. Similarly, the Metropolitan Sewer District provides sanitary and storm sewer service to the city and much of St. Louis County. The Bi-State Development Agency (now known as Metro) runs the region's MetroLink light rail system and bus system.

The City of St. Louis Sheriff's Office (STLSO or STLCSO) primarily provides security services for the courtrooms, as well as serving court documents and issuing gun carry permits. In 2022, they gained the ability to make arrests and traffic stops.

State and federal government

St. Louis is split between 11 districts in the Missouri House of Representatives: all of the 76th, 77th, 78th, 79th, 80th, 81st, 82nd, and 84th, and parts of the 66th, 83rd, and 93rd, which are shared with St. Louis County. The 5th Missouri Senate district is entirely within the city, while the 4th is shared with St. Louis County.

A Republican has not represented a significant portion of St. Louis in the U.S. House since 1953. Correspondingly, despite voting Republican prior to 1928 in presidential elections, from then on the city has become a Democratic stronghold at the presidential level. George H. W. Bush in 1988 was the most recent Republican to win even a quarter of the city's votes in a presidential election.

The United States Court of Appeals for the Eighth Circuit and the United States District Court for the Eastern District of Missouri are based in the Thomas F. Eagleton United States Courthouse in downtown St. Louis. St. Louis is also home to a Federal Reserve System branch, the Federal Reserve Bank of St. Louis. The National Geospatial-Intelligence Agency (NGA) also maintains major facilities in the St. Louis area.

The Military Personnel Records Center (NPRC-MPR) located at 9700 Page Avenue in St. Louis, is a branch of the National Personnel Records Center and is the repository of over 56 million military personnel records and medical records pertaining to retired, discharged, and deceased veterans of the U.S. armed forces.

Education

Colleges and universities

The city is home to three national research universities, Washington University in St. Louis, Saint Louis University, as classified under the Carnegie Classification of Institutions of Higher Education. Washington University School of Medicine in St. Louis has been ranked among the top 10 medical schools in the country by U.S. News & World Report for as long as the list has been published, and as high as second, in 2003 and 2004. U.S. News & World Report also ranks the undergraduate school and other graduate schools, such as the Washington University School of Law, in the top 20 in the nation.

St. Louis Metropolitan Region is home to St. Louis Community College.  It is also home to several other 4-year colleges & universities, including Harris–Stowe State University, a historically black public university, Fontbonne University, Webster University, Missouri Baptist University, University of Health Sciences & Pharmacy (the former Saint Louis College of Pharmacy), Southern Illinois University-Edwardsville (SIUE), and Lindenwood University.

In addition to Catholic theological institutions such as Kenrick-Glennon Seminary and Aquinas Institute of Theology sponsored by the Order of Preachers, St. Louis is home to three Protestant seminaries: Eden Theological Seminary of the United Church of Christ, Covenant Theological Seminary of the Presbyterian Church in America, and Concordia Seminary of the St. Louis-based Lutheran Church–Missouri Synod.

Primary and secondary schools

The St. Louis Public Schools (SLPS), which covers the entire city, operate more than 75 schools, attended by more than 25,000 students, including several magnet schools. SLPS operates under provisional accreditation from the state of Missouri and is under the governance of a state-appointed school board called the Special Administrative Board, although a local board continues to exist without legal authority over the district. Since 2000, charter schools have operated in the city of St. Louis using authorization from Missouri state law. These schools are sponsored by local institutions or corporations and take in students from kindergarten through high school.  In addition, several private schools exist in the city, and the Archdiocese of St. Louis operates dozens of parochial schools in the city, including parochial high schools. The city also has several private high schools, including secular, Montessori, Catholic and Lutheran schools. St. Louis University High School – a Jesuit preparatory high school founded in 1818 – is the oldest secondary educational institution in the U.S. west of the Mississippi River. The state-operated K-12 boarding school Missouri School for the Blind is in St. Louis.

Media

Greater St. Louis commands the 19th-largest media market in the United States, a position roughly unchanged for over a decade. All of the major U.S. television networks have affiliates in St. Louis, including KTVI 2 (Fox), KMOV 4 (CBS), KSDK 5 (NBC), KETC 9 (PBS), KPLR-TV 11 (The CW), KDNL 30 (ABC), WRBU 46 (Ion), and WPXS 51 Daystar Television Network. Among the area's most popular radio stations are KMOX (AM sports and talk, notable as the longtime flagship station for St. Louis Cardinals broadcasts), KLOU (FM oldies), WIL-FM (FM country), WARH (FM adult hits), and KSLZ (FM Top 40 mainstream). St. Louis also supports public radio's KWMU, an NPR affiliate, and community radio's KDHX.  All-sports stations, such as KFNS 590 AM "The Fan" and WXOS "101.1 ESPN" are also popular.

The St. Louis Post-Dispatch is the region's major newspaper. Others in the region include the Suburban Journals, which serve parts of St. Louis County, while the primary alternative newspaper is the Riverfront Times. Three weeklies serve the African-American community: the St. Louis Argus, the St. Louis American, and the St. Louis Sentinel. St. Louis Magazine, a monthly magazine, covers topics such as local history, cuisine, and lifestyles, while the weekly St. Louis Business Journal provides coverage of regional business news. St. Louis was served by an online newspaper, the St. Louis Beacon, but that publication merged with KWMU in 2013.

Many books and movies have been written about St. Louis.  A few of the most influential and prominent films are Meet Me in St. Louis and American Flyers, and novels include The Killing Dance, Meet Me in St. Louis, The Runaway Soul, The Rose of Old St. Louis, and Circus of the Damned.

As St. Louis was a prime location for immigrants to move to, much of the early social work depicting immigrant life was based on St. Louis, such as in the book The Immigrant in St. Louis.

Transportation

Road, rail, ship, and air transportation modes connect the city with surrounding communities in Greater St. Louis, national transportation networks, and international locations. St. Louis also supports a public transportation network that includes bus and light rail service.

Roads and highways

Four interstate highways connect the city to a larger regional highway system. Interstate 70, an east–west highway, runs from the northwest corner of the city to downtown St. Louis. The north–south Interstate 55 enters the city at the south near the Carondelet neighborhood and runs toward the center of the city, and both Interstate 64 and Interstate 44 enter the city on the west, running parallel to the east. Two of the four interstates (Interstates 55 and 64) merge south of Gateway Arch National Park and leave the city on the Poplar Street Bridge into Illinois, while Interstate 44 terminates at Interstate 70 at its new interchange near N Broadway and Cass Ave. A small portion of the Interstate 270 outer belt freeway runs through the northern end of the city.

The 563-mile Avenue of the Saints links St. Louis with St. Paul, Minnesota.

Major roadways include the north–south Memorial Drive, located on the western edge of Gateway Arch National Park and parallel to Interstate 70, the north–south streets of Grand Boulevard and Jefferson Avenue, both of which run the length of the city, and Gravois Road, which runs from the southeastern portion of the city to downtown and used to be signed as U.S. Route 66. An east-west roadway that connects the city with surrounding communities is Martin Luther King, Jr. Drive, which carries traffic from the western edge of the city to downtown.

Metro Light Rail and Subway

The Red Line and The Blue Line both serve all the stations in the inner city, and branch to different destinations beyond in the suburban areas. Both lines enter the city north of Forest Park on the western edge of the city or on the Eads Bridge in downtown St. Louis to Illinois. All of the system track is in independent right of way, with both surface level and underground subway track in the city. All stations are independent entry, while all platforms are flush-level with trains. Rail service is provided by the Bi-State Development Agency (also known as Metro), which is funded by a sales taxes levied in the city and other counties in the region. The Gateway Multimodal Transportation Center acts as the hub station in the city of St. Louis, linking the city's light rail system, local bus system, passenger rail service, and national bus service. It is located just east of the historic grand St. Louis Union Station.

Airports

St. Louis is served by two passenger airports. St. Louis Lambert International Airport, owned and operated by the City of St. Louis, is 11 miles northwest of downtown along highway I-70 between I-170 and I-270 in St. Louis County. It is the largest and busiest airport in the state. In 2016, when the airport had more than 255 daily departures to about 90 domestic and international locations, it served more than 15 million passengers. The airport serves as a focus hub city for Southwest Airlines; it was once a hub for Trans World Airlines and a focus-city for American Airlines and AmericanConnection. The airport has two terminals with a total of five concourses. International flights and passengers use Terminal 2, whose lower level holds the Immigration and Customs gates. Passengers can move between the terminals on complimentary buses that run continuously, or via MetroLink for a fee. It was possible to walk between the terminals until Concourse D was closed in 2008.

MidAmerica St. Louis Airport is the secondary passenger airport serving the metropolitan area. Located 17 miles east of the city downtown core, the airport serves domestic passengers. Air cargo transportation is available at Lambert International and at other nearby regional airports, including MidAmerica St. Louis Airport, Spirit of St. Louis Airport, and St. Louis Downtown Airport.

Port authority
River transportation is available through the Port of St. Louis, which is 19.3 miles of riverbank on the Mississippi River that handles more than 32 million tons of freight annually. The Port is the second largest inland port by trip-ton miles, and the third largest by tonnage in the United States, with more than 100 docks for barges and 16 public terminals on the river. The Port Authority added two new small fire and rescue craft in 2012 and 2013.

Railroad service

Inter-city rail passenger train service in the city is provided by Amtrak at the Gateway Multimodal Transportation Center downtown. Amtrak trains terminating in the city include the Lincoln Service to Chicago and the Missouri River Runner to Kansas City, Missouri. St. Louis is an intermediate stop on the Texas Eagle route which provides long-distance passenger service between Chicago, San Antonio, and three days a week, to Los Angeles.

St. Louis is the nation's third largest freight rail hub, moving Missouri exports such as fertilizer, gravel, crushed stone, prepared foodstuffs, fats, oils, nonmetallic mineral products, grain, alcohol, tobacco products, automobiles, and automobile parts. Freight rail service in St. Louis is provided on tracks owned by Union Pacific Railroad, Norfolk Southern Railway, Foster Townsend Rail Logistics – formerly Manufacturers Railway (St. Louis), Terminal Railroad Association of St. Louis, Affton Trucking, and the BNSF Railway.

The Terminal Railroad Association of St. Louis (reporting mark: TRRA) is a switching and terminal railroad jointly owned by all the major rail carriers in St. Louis. The company operates 30 diesel-electric locomotives to move railcars around the classification yards, deliver railcars to local industries, and ready trains for departure. The TRRA processes and dispatches a significant portion of railroad traffic moving through the city and owns and operates a network of rail bridges and tunnels including the MacArthur Bridge (St. Louis) and the Merchants Bridge. This infrastructure is also used by inter-city rail and long-distance passenger trains serving St. Louis.

Bus service

Local bus service in the city of St. Louis is provided by the Bi-State Development Agency via MetroBus, with more than 75 routes connecting to MetroLink light rail transit and stops in the city and region. The city is also served by Madison County Transit, which connects downtown St. Louis to Madison County, Illinois. National bus service in the city is offered by Greyhound Lines, Burlington Trailways and Amtrak Thruway Motorcoach, with a station at the Gateway Multimodal Transportation Center, and Megabus, with a stop at St. Louis Union Station.

Taxi
Taxicab service in the city is provided by private companies regulated by the Metropolitan Taxicab Commission. Rates vary by vehicle type, size, passengers and distance, and by regulation all taxicab fares must be calculated using a taximeter and be payable in cash or credit card. Solicitation by a driver is prohibited, although a taxicab may be hailed on the street or at a stand.

Notable people

Sister cities
St. Louis has 16 sister cities.

 Bologna, Italy
 Bogor, Indonesia
 Brčko, Brčko District, Bosnia and Herzegovina
 Donegal, County Donegal, Ireland
 Galway, County Galway, Ireland
 Georgetown, Guyana
 Lyon, France
 Nanjing, China
 Rosario, Santa Fe, Argentina
 Saint-Louis, Senegal
 Samara, Russia
 San Luis Potosí, Mexico
 Stuttgart, Germany
 Suwa, Japan
 Szczecin, Poland
 Wuhan, China

See also

Caves of St. Louis
Delmar Divide
Downtown St. Louis
Laclede's Landing, St. Louis
Downtown West, St. Louis
Great Flood of 1993
Heat wave of 2006 derecho series
History of the Jews in St. Louis
LaClede Town
LGBT culture in St. Louis
List of mayors of St. Louis
List of tallest buildings in St. Louis
National Register of Historic Places listings in St. Louis (city, A–L), Missouri
National Register of Historic Places listings in St. Louis (city, M-Z), Missouri
Neighborhoods of St. Louis
Roman Catholic Archdiocese of St. Louis
St. Louis cuisine
St. Louis in the Civil War
1939 St. Louis smog
 List of Veiled Prophet Parade themes
USS St. Louis, 7 ships

Notes

References

Further reading
Henry W. Berger, St. Louis and Empire: 250 Years of Imperial Quest and Urban Crisis. Carbondale, IL: Southern Illinois University Press, 2015.
Carl J. Ekberg and Sharon K. Person, St. Louis Rising: The French Regime of Louis St. Ange de Bellerive. Urbana, IL: University of Illinois Press, 2015.
Gordon, Colin. Mapping Decline: St. Louis and the Fate of the American City. Philadelphia: University of Pennsylvania Press, 2008.

External links

St. Louis Regional Chamber and Growth Association
Historic maps of St. Louis in the Sanborn Maps of Missouri Collection at the University of Missouri

 

 
1764 establishments in New Spain
1764 in New France
Cities in Greater St. Louis
Cities in Missouri
Former colonial and territorial capitals in the United States
French colonial settlements of Upper Louisiana
Independent cities in the United States
Inland port cities and towns of the United States
Missouri counties on the Mississippi River
Missouri counties on the Missouri River
Missouri populated places on the Mississippi River
Populated places established in 1764
Regions of Greater St. Louis